The 1946–47 Tercera División was the 11th edition of the Spanish national third tier.

Format 
120 clubs in 12 geographic groups of 10 participated. The winner and runner up of each group (24 teams) progressed to the second phase (Fase Intermedia). In the second phase 3 groups of 8 teams were formed with each club playing home and away matches (14 matches each).  The winners and runners up (6 teams) entered the Fase Final and played home and away against each other (10 matches each).  The winner and runner up of the Fase Final were promoted to the Segunda División, and the third placed team played off in a promotion/relegation tie against the 12th placed team in the Segunda División.

Regular season

Group 1

Group 2

Group 3

Group 4

Group 5

Group 6

Group 7

Group 8

Group 9

Group 10

Group 11

Group 12

Fase Intermedia (Second phase)

Group 1

Note: Albacete and Cultural Leonesa were removed from the competition after being found guilty of match-fixing.

Group 2

Group 3

Fase Final

Promotion/relegation playoff

Promotion to Segunda: Valladolid
Relegation to Tercera: R. Santander

References

External links
www.rsssf.com
Research by Asociación para la Recopilación de Estadísticas del Fútbol (AREFE)

Tercera División seasons
3
Spain